This is a chronological list of years in video games that indexes the years in video games pages. Years are annotated with significant events in the history of video games.

1970s

 1970 in video games
 1971 in video games – Computer Space, the first public arcade game, is released.
 1972 in video games
 The Magnavox Odyssey, the first home video game console, is released.
 The first Pong arcade is made available.
 1973 in video games
 1974 in video games – Maze War and Spasim are released as the first first-person shooter games.
 1975 in video games
 1976 in video games 
 1977 in video games – The Atari Video Computer System (later the Atari 2600) is released as the first widely popular home video game console.
 1978 in video games – Space Invaders is released, popularizing video games among the general public, beginning the golden age of arcade video games.
 1979 in video games

1980s

 1980 in video games
 1981 in video games
 1982 in video games
 1983 in video games
 The Famicom, the first console by Nintendo, is released in Japan.
 The video game crash of 1983, the most prominent video game crash, takes place.
 1984 in video games
 1985 in video games – The Nintendo Entertainment System is released as an international version of the Famicom.
 1986 in video games
 1987 in video games
 1988 in video games
 1989 in video games – The TurboGrafx-16 and the Sega Genesis released as the first home video game consoles in the United States with 16-bit graphics.

1990s

 1990 in video games – Nintendo releases the Super Nintendo Entertainment System in Japan, preceding a worldwide release over the following years.
 1991 in video games
 1992 in video games
 1993 in video games
 1994 in video games – Sony releases its first video game console, the PlayStation.
 1995 in video games
 1996 in video games – Nintendo releases the Nintendo 64.
 1997 in video games
 1998 in video games
 1999 in video games

2000s

 2000 in video games
 2001 in video games – Microsoft releases its first video game console, the Xbox.
 2002 in video games
 2003 in video games
 2004 in video games
 2005 in video games
 2006 in video games
 2007 in video games
 2008 in video games
 2009 in video games

2010s

 2010 in video games
 2011 in video games
 2012 in video games
 2013 in video games
 2014 in video games
 2015 in video games
 2016 in video games
 2017 in video games
 2018 in video games
 2019 in video games

2020s
 2020 in video games
 2021 in video games
 2022 in video games
 2023 in video games

See also 

 Lists of years by topic
 List of years in games

References 

 
video games
video games
video games